NGC 271 is a barred spiral galaxy in the constellation Cetus. It was discovered on October 1, 1785 by William Herschel.

References

External links
 

0271
17851001
Cetus (constellation)
Barred spiral galaxies
002949
Discoveries by William Herschel
+00-03-012